The Talented Mr. Ripley is a 1955 psychological thriller novel by Patricia Highsmith. This novel introduced the character of Tom Ripley, who returns in four subsequent novels. It has been adapted numerous times for screen, including Purple Noon (1960) starring Alain Delon and The Talented Mr. Ripley (1999) starring Matt Damon.

Plot
Tom Ripley is a young man struggling to make a living in New York City by whatever means necessary, including a series of small-time confidence scams. One day, he is approached by shipping magnate Herbert Greenleaf to travel to "Mongibello" (based on the resort town Positano), in Italy, to persuade Greenleaf's errant son, Dickie, to return to the United States and join the family business. Ripley agrees, exaggerating his friendship with Dickie, a half-remembered acquaintance, in order to gain the elder Greenleaf's trust.

Shortly after his arrival in Italy, Ripley meets Dickie and Dickie's girlfriend Marge Sherwood, and Dickie allows Tom Ripley to stay with him in his Italian home. As Ripley and Dickie spend more time together, Marge feels left out. However, soon after Ripley arrives, Freddie Miles, a school friend of Dickie's, visits Dickie's summer home. Tom begins to grow jealous of Freddie, and grows closer to Marge over their shared anguish in Dickie's shifting loyalty.

Dickie becomes upset when he unexpectedly finds Ripley in his bedroom dressed up in his clothes and imitating his mannerisms. From this moment on, Ripley senses that Dickie has begun to tire of him, resenting his constant presence and growing personal dependence. Ripley has indeed become obsessed with Dickie, which is further reinforced by his desire to imitate and maintain the wealthy lifestyle Dickie has afforded him. As a gesture to Ripley, Dickie agrees to travel with him on a short holiday to San Remo. Sensing that he is about to cut him loose, Ripley finally decides to murder Dickie and assume his identity. When the two set sail in a small rented boat, Ripley beats him to death with an oar, dumps his anchor-weighted body into the water, and scuttles the boat.

Ripley assumes Dickie's identity, living off the latter's trust fund and carefully providing communications to Marge to assure her that Dickie has dumped her. Ripley forges checks and changes his appearance to better resemble Dickie in order to continue the lavish lifestyle he has enjoyed. Freddie Miles encounters Ripley at what he supposes to be Dickie's apartment in Rome; he soon suspects something is wrong. When Miles finally confronts him, Ripley kills him with a heavy glass ashtray in the apartment. He later disposes of the body on the outskirts of Rome, attempting to make the police believe that robbers have murdered Miles.

Ripley enters a cat-and-mouse game with the Italian police but manages to keep himself safe by restoring his own identity and moving to Venice. In succession, Marge, Dickie's father, and an American private detective confront Ripley, who suggests to them that Dickie was depressed and may have committed suicide. Marge stays for a while at Ripley's rented house in Venice. When she discovers Dickie's rings in Ripley's possession, she seems to be on the verge of realizing the truth. Panicked, Ripley contemplates murdering Marge, but she is saved when she says that if Dickie gave his rings to Ripley, then he probably meant to kill himself.

The story concludes with Ripley traveling to Greece and resigning himself to eventually getting caught. However, he discovers that the Greenleaf family has accepted that Dickie is dead and that they have transferred his inheritance to Ripley – in accordance with a will forged by Ripley on Dickie's Hermes typewriter. While the book ends with Ripley happily rich, it also suggests that he may forever be dogged by paranoia. In one of the final paragraphs, he nervously envisions a group of police officers waiting to arrest him, and Highsmith leaves her protagonist wondering, "...was he going to see policemen waiting for him on every pier that he ever approached?" Ripley however quickly dismisses this and proceeds with his trip.

Reception
In 1956, the Mystery Writers of America nominated the novel for the Edgar Allan Poe Award for Best Novel. In 1957, the novel won the Grand Prix de Littérature Policière as best international crime novel.

On 5 November 2019, the BBC News listed The Talented Mr. Ripley on its list of the 100 most inspiring novels.

Adaptations

Television
 The novel was first adapted for a January 1956 episode of the anthology television series Studio One.
 Ripley, a series for Showtime starring Andrew Scott as Tom Ripley, was announced in September 2019. An eight-episode first season was commissioned by Showtime, to be written and directed by Steven Zaillian, who pitched the series to the network. The series was moved to Netflix in February 2023.

Film
 Plein Soleil (originally), also known as Purple Noon (1960), directed by René Clément, stars Alain Delon as Ripley and Maurice Ronet as Greenleaf.
 The 1999 film version, directed by Anthony Minghella, stars Matt Damon as Ripley, Jude Law as Dickie and Gwyneth Paltrow as Marge.
 The 2012 Indian Tamil-language adaptation Naan is based on both the novel and its 1999 adaptation.

Radio
 The 2009 BBC Radio 4 adaptation of the Ripley novels stars Ian Hart as Ripley, Stephen Hogan as Dickie, and Barbara Barnes as Marge.

Audiobook
 In 2007, an unabridged audiobook was published, narrated by David Menkin.

Theatre
 In 2010, the novel was adapted into a stage production at Northampton's Royal Theatre starring Michelle Ryan.

Footnotes

External links
 

1955 American novels
American novels adapted into films
American novels adapted into plays
American thriller novels
Grand Prix de Littérature Policière winners
Novels about serial killers
American novels adapted into television shows
Novels by Patricia Highsmith
Novels set in Greece
Novels set in New York City
Novels set in Rome
Novels set in Venice
Novels with gay themes
Psychological novels
Coward-McCann books